This list of University of Georgia people includes alumni, affiliates and current students of the University of Georgia. Honorary degree recipients are not included.

Chief executives and presidents of the University of Georgia

Alumni

Arts, media and entertainment

 

[[File:From Brownsville, Brooklyn to the Oval Office- Vidal Meets the President.webm|thumb|right|180px|Brandon Stanton, The New York Times Best Selling author and one of Time'''s "30 Under 30 People Changing The World" visits President Barack Obama at the White House ]]

Business and industry

Economics and finance

Eugene Robert Black, Chairman of the Federal Reserve 
Eugene R. Black Sr. former president of the World Bank, chairman of the Brookings Institution, Special Adviser to the President on Southeast Asian Social and Economic Development, board member multiple corporations and foundations, honorary Doctor of Laws from Princeton University, Chair of the Peabody Award Board of Jurors
Robert D. McTeer, president of the Federal Reserve Bank of Dallas
Bernard Ramsey, senior vice president and chairman of the executive committee of Merrill Lynch
Charles S. Sanford Jr., chairman of the board and chief executive officer of Bankers Trust

Educators

Government and the law

Media and journalism

Medicine

Military

Ministry and religion
Benjamin M. Palmer, American writer and theologian who was the first national moderator of Presbyterian Church, professor at Amherst College and Columbia Theological Seminary, longtime pastor of First Presbyterian of New Orleans (1856–1902)
George Foster Pierce, bishop of the Methodist Episcopal Church, South, president of Wesleyan College and Emory University
David Platt, pastor and author of the New York Times best seller RadicalScientific research
Wyatt Anderson, geneticist, professor of Genetics at University of Georgia, Alumni Foundation Distinguished Professor, member of the National Academy of Sciences, Fellow of American Academy of Arts and Sciences, Fellow of American Association for the Advancement of Science
Cornelia Bargmann, award winning neurobiologist, Wiesel Professor of Genetics and Neurosciences at the Rockefeller University, investigator at Howard Hughes Medical Institute, president of science at the Chan Zuckerberg Initiative 
 Sir David Baulcombe, FRS, British plant scientist and geneticist; post-doctoral fellow 1978–1980, now Professor of Botany at the University of Cambridge
Alfred Blalock, medical doctor, pioneered heart surgery and performed groundbreaking research on shock
Eugene T. Booth, Rhodes Scholar, nuclear physicist; member of the historic Columbia University team which made the first demonstration of nuclear fission in the United States; worked on the Manhattan Project
 James E. Boyd, physicist, mathematician, and founder of Scientific Atlanta, part of Cisco
A. Jamie Cuticchia, bioinformatics pioneer with expertise in the fields of genetics, bioinformatics, and genomics who was responsible for the collection of the data constituting the human gene map and who is director of human genome database
Leonard DeLonga, sculptor, painter, and professor at Mount Holyoke College
Charles Herty, academic, chemist and businessman; namesake of UGA's Herty Field
Cynthia Kenyon, professor of biochemistry, biophysics, University of California-San Francisco, member of National Academy of Sciences
Bjørn Lomborg, Danish author, professor, and president of the think tank Copenhagen Consensus Center
Eugene Odum, American biologist known for his pioneering work on ecosystem ecology, author of the first ecology textbook, Fundamentals of Ecology'' 
Kerwin Swint, political scientist and author, known for his research and writing in the fields of political campaigns, mass media, and political history

Sports

Distinguished faculty and staff
The University of Georgia has boasted many distinguished researchers and scholars on its faculty. Notable past and present faculty and staff include:

Administration

 Donald R. Eastman III, served as the vice president for university relations at the University of Georgia 1991–1998; vice president for strategic planning and public affairs at the University of Georgia 1998–2001
 Karen Holbrook, former senior vice president for academic affairs and provost at UGA; former president of Ohio State University

Arts and humanities

Education

Donna Alvermann, educator, currently university-appointed Distinguished Research Professor of Language and Literacy Education at University of Georgia

Mathematics

Andrew Granville, professor of mathematics and David C. Barrow Chair of Mathematics at the University of Georgia, 1991–2002
Carl Pomerance, former professor of mathematics at University of Georgia, distinguished number theorist (Lenstra-Pomerance-Wagstaff conjecture)
Robert Rumely, professor of Mathematics at the University of Georgia and numbers theory researcher (Adleman–Pomerance–Rumely primality test)

Scientific research

Sports

References

University of Georgia people